Rear Admiral Odd Stan-Eric Werin (born 12 January 1958) is a retired Swedish Navy officer.

Career
Odd Werin was born on 12 January 1958 in Stockholm, Sweden.

He completed training as a naval officer, which he completed in 1981.

Werin was commander of the 33rd Coastal Corvette Division (33. kustkorvettdivisionen) in Karlskrona before starting a new job on 2 February 1998 as a staff officer in the Partnership Coordination Cell with the Partnership for Peace program at the Supreme Headquarters Allied Powers Europe in Mons, Belgium.

From 2000 to 2003, Werin was commander of the 2nd Surface Combat Flotilla (Andra ytstridsflottiljen).

Since 1 September 2013, Werin has been Sweden’s military representative to the EU and NATO.

In May 2015, Werin is one of the Swedish people sanctioned by Russia during the Russo-Ukrainian War.

References

1958 births
Living people
Swedish Navy rear admirals
Military personnel from Stockholm